Go for Broke! is a 1951 black-and-white war film directed by Robert Pirosh, produced by Dore Schary and starring Van Johnson and six veterans of the 442nd Regimental Combat Team. The film co-stars Henry Nakamura, Warner Anderson, and Don Haggerty in its large cast.

The film dramatizes the real-life story of the 442nd, which was composed of Nisei (second-generation Americans born of Japanese parents) soldiers.

Fighting in the European theater during World War II, this unit became the most heavily decorated unit for its size and length of service in the history of the United States Army, as well as one of the units with the highest casualty rates. This film is a Hollywood rarity for its era in that it features Asian Americans in a positive light, highlighting the wartime efforts of Japanese Americans on behalf of their country even while that same country confined their families in camps.

As with his earlier film script for Battleground, in which Van Johnson also starred, writer-director Robert Pirosh focuses on the average squad member, mixing humor with pathos, while accurately detailing equipment and tactics used by American infantry in World War II. The contrast of reality versus public relations, the hardships of field life on the line, and the reality of high casualty rates are accurately portrayed with a minimum of heroics.

In 1979, the film entered the public domain in the United States because Metro-Goldwyn-Mayer failed to renew its copyright registration in the 28th year after publication.

Plot
In 1943 at Camp Shelby, Mississippi, the newly commissioned Lt. Michael Grayson reports for duty to train the 442nd, a unit established on the US mainland and composed of Nisei. His expectation was to return to the U.S. 36th Infantry Division, a Texas National Guard unit, which he had served as an enlisted soldier. He has to come to terms with a group of people that he sees as Japanese, the enemy, rather than Americans. Grayson runs his platoon rather insisting on strict observance of military regulations.

He learns that "Go for broke" is a pidgin phrase used in Hawaii meaning to gamble everything, to "shoot the works"—to risk "going broke" or bankruptcy. Grayson comes to learn the meaning of the frequently exclaimed Baka tare, which, loosely translates to mean "very stupid."

There is only one brief discussion of the internment camps from which some of the men have come, but throughout the film there are references to the camps. There are also a few brief references to the distinctions between the Nisei from Hawaii and the mainland. When the islanders who formed 2/3 of the outfit  and the mainlanders first met in Camp Shelby, their very different cultures and expectations were bound to clash. The Hawaiians, products of the plantation system, enjoyed a sense of group solidarity—even, as the largest minority group in the islands, a sense of ethnic superiority. The mainlanders, by contrast, were used to life as a tiny and—after the 'relocation' -- legally oppressed minority. While Buta-heads (the phrase later devolved to "Buddha-Heads") are a key part of the Hawaiian economy and Hawaiian society, Katonks were largely distrusted and disliked by their neighbors.

Arriving in Italy, the unit is joined by the 100th Battalion, a Nisei unit formed in Hawaii before the 442nd. The troops of the 100th are seasoned veterans and the new arrivals look to them for advice. On the march to the front lines, Grayson gets left behind when fraternizing with a signorina, but he is not found by the colonel because his platoon has covered for him during an inspection of their positions.

By the actions by the 442nd in Italy and France, Grayson finds reason to replace his bigotry with respect toward them. His transfer to the 36th, as a liaison—over his objections—comes through when the 442nd is attached to the 36th. As he has misjudged the Nisei, they have misjudged him. The Nisei learn that he has defended them against bigotry, even getting into a fistfight with an old friend from the 36th had insulted them.

The 36th is surrounded by the German army and the "Buddha-heads'" rescue "them". On their return home, they are the awarded the distinction of the eighth Presidential Unit Citation.

Cast

Van Johnson as Lt. Michael Grayson
Lane Nakano‡ as Sam
George Miki‡ as Chick
Akira Fukunaga‡ as Frank
Ken K. Okamoto‡ as Kaz
Henry Oyasato‡ as Takashi Ohhara
Harry Hamada‡ as Masami
Henry Nakamura as Tommy Kamakura
Warner Anderson as Col. Charles W. Pence
Don Haggerty as Sgt. Wilson I. Culley
Gianna Maria Canale as Rosina
Dan Riss as Capt. Solari
 John Banner as a German soldier
Jerry Fujikawa as Communications Sergeant (uncredited)
 Richard Anderson as Lieutenant (uncredited)
 Hugh Beaumont as Chaplain (uncredited)
 Frank Wilcox as HQ General (uncredited)
 Mario Siletti as Italian Farmer (uncredited)
 Edward Earle as General at Dress Parade (uncredited)
 Ann Codee as Pianist (uncredited)
 
‡These actors were actual veterans of the 442nd.

The film includes archive footage of General Mark Clark and President Harry Truman presenting the unit citation.

Reception
According to MGM records, the film made $2,531,000 in the US and Canada and $806,000 overseas, resulting in a profit of $761,000.

Honors
The screenplay by Robert Pirosh was nominated for an Academy Award in 1951.

See also
Go For Broke Monument
Only the Brave
American Pastime

References

Notes

Additional sources 
 Wu, Ellen D. (2014). The Color of Success: Asian Americans and the Invention of the Model Minority. Princeton University Press. , pp. 88ff.
 Barsam, Richard Meran. (1992).  Nonfiction Film : a Critical History. Bloomington, Indiana: Indiana University Press. ; ;   OCLC 24107769
 Takemoto, Kenneth Kaname. (2006).  Nisei Memories: My Parents Talk About the War Years. Seattle: University of Washington Press. ;   OCLC 260074492
 Sterner, C. Dougals. (2008).  Go for broke : the Nisei Warriors of World War II Who Conquered Germany, Japan, and American Bigotry. Clearfield, Utah: American Legacy Historical Press. ;   OCLC 141855086
 Yenne, Bill. (2007).  Rising Sons: The Japanese American GIs Who Fought for the United States in World War II. New York: Macmillan.  OCLC 122261832
Steidl, Franz. (1997). "Lost Battalions: Going for Broke in the Vosges, Autumn 1944." Novato, California: Presidio Press. , ; OCLC 36170542

External links
 
 
 
 

1951 films
1951 war films
Films about Japanese Americans
Metro-Goldwyn-Mayer films
Italian Campaign of World War II films
American black-and-white films
1950s English-language films
Films about the internment of Japanese Americans
Films directed by Robert Pirosh
1951 directorial debut films
Articles containing video clips
Films set in Mississippi
Films set in Italy
Films set in France
American war films
World War II films based on actual events
1950s American films